Traganopsis is a genus of flowering plants belonging to the family Amaranthaceae.

Its native range is Morocco to Western Sahara.

Species:
 Traganopsis glomerata Maire & Wilczek

References

Amaranthaceae
Taxa named by René Maire
Amaranthaceae genera